Diljot Garcha is an Indian music video director best known for his music videos like Mera Jee Karda, Kinaare, Gumaan and Gallan Ne 2.

Early life 
Garcha belongs to Ludhiana, Punjab.

Career 
Garcha stated his career with music video Mera Jee Krda starring Jonita Gandhi and Deep Jandu.
He directed music videos Gumaan and Kinaare starring Sharry Maan.
He also directed Gallan Ne 2, Front Fire and Nachna Payu.
He has also given visual effects to Diljit Dosanjh's music video Lover.

Music Videos

References 

Living people
Year of birth missing (living people)
Indian music video directors
People from Ludhiana